David Kristol (born 1938) is an emeritus professor at New Jersey Institute of Technology (NJIT).  He created the Biomedical Engineering department at NJIT, but he spent most of his career working as a chemistry professor.

References
     2.  https://web.archive.org/web/20110803235529/http://biomedical.njit.edu/people/kristol.php

See Also
 List of computer science publications by David M. Kristol on the dblp computer science bibliography

1938 births
Living people
New Jersey Institute of Technology faculty